Longfu Town is an urban town in Liuyang City, Hunan Province, People's Republic of China.  it had a population of 46,600 and an area of .  It borders Shegang Town in the east and northeast, Shashi Town in the west and northwest, and Chunkou Town in the south.

History
Longfu is situated on the bank of Laodao River of Liuyang city. Longfu has a long history and is rich in historic and cultural remains and heritage. A quite complete ancient village pattern has been well preserved. The Xinkai Village has the largest number of ancient folk houses in Changsha-Zhuzhou-Xiangtan area. Many intangible cultural heritages like Weigu, Yege and Shujia have distinctive local features. The Xinkai Village was rated as a "Historic and Cultural Village of Hunan" in 2005.

Administrative division
The town is divided into 10 villages and two communities, the following areas: Longfu Community, Banchun Community, Xinkai Village, Huangqiao Village, Dafeng Village, Jiaoqiao Village, Pingshang Village, Xiangshi Village, Zhezhuang Village, Shangbu Village, Shijiang Village, and Shizhufeng Village.

Geography

Education
 Longfu Meddle School

Transportation
 National Highway G106
 Liuli Expressway

Attractions

The Dajiang Dam, which was the first dam of Laodao River, built throughout the Xianfeng (1851-1861), Tongzhi (1862-1874) and Guangxu (1875-1908) periods of the Qing dynasty (1644-1912), and the ancient ditches have also been well preserved.

The Former Residence of Jiao Dafeng, the Site of Peiwen Tower and Shizhu Peak Scenic Spot are famous sightseeing spots.

Celebrity
 Jiao Dafeng (1886-1911), revolutionary martyr.
 Zhou Qifeng, former president of Peking University.
 Shen Rengan, former deputy director of the State Copyright Bureau.
 Jiao Jiege, president of Hainan Medical University.
 Dai Deqing, secretary general of Xiangtan Government.

References

External links

Divisions of Liuyang
Liuyang